Dermott High School is an accredited public high school located in the community of Dermott, Arkansas, United States. It is the only high school administered by the Dermott School District and is one of two public high schools based in Chicot County, Arkansas. The school has just over 200 students, in grades 7 through 12.

History 
In summer 1885, Dermott established its first public white school, which was used in the winter as a black school. After its first year, various buildings were used until 1908 when the current school system was established including a new elementary school. The original 1908 brick building was used until 1976. 

In 1889, Isaac George Bailey co-founded a school for African Americans in Dermott. It was succeeded by Morris-Booker High School and Memorial College. Chicot County High School was a segregated high school for African Americans in the county. It closed with desegregation. Nobel Leftwich had served as its principal. As part of a series of retrospective painting of Dermott, Larry D. Alexander painted Chicot County High School.

Attendance boundary
In Chicot County, the school district (and therefore the high school) serves Dermott. A portion of the district extends into Desha County, where it serves Halley. Another portion extends into Drew County, where it includes Collins.

Academics 
The typical course of study follows the Smart Core curriculum developed by the Arkansas Department of Education (ADE). Students complete regular (core and elective) and career focus courses and exams, with optional Advanced Placement (AP) coursework and exams.  Graduating students who complete Smart Core requirements and maintain a 3.5 Grade Point Average (GPA) or above will be conferred as Honor Graduates.

Dermott is accredited by the ADE and has been accredited by AdvancED since 1954.

Extracurricular activities 
The Dermott High School mascot and athletic emblem is the Ram with school colors of black and orange.

Athletics 
For 2012–14, the Dermott Rams compete in interscholastic sporting activities within the 2A Classification from the 2A Region 7 West Conference administered by the Arkansas Activities Association. The Rams participate in boys and girls basketball and track and field.

 Football: Dermott has won the state football championships once, in 1947; Dermott no longer plays football.
 Track and field: In 1981, the Dermott boys track team won the school's only state track and field championship.
 Basketball: The boys basketball teams have won four state championships (1986, 1989, 1991, 1994).  In 1986, Dermott's team achieved a 35-0 undefeated season as well as winning the state overall basketball championship, a now-defunct tournament played between each classification's state champion.

Notable alumni 

 Larry D. Alexander (Class of 1971) - Artist and Christian Author
 Fred Haas (Class of 1933)—Professional golfer; 1937 NCAA individual golf champion.

References

External links 
 

Educational institutions established in 1908
Public high schools in Arkansas
Public middle schools in Arkansas
Schools in Chicot County, Arkansas
1908 establishments in Arkansas
Dermott, Arkansas